Sir John Christopher Blake Richmond  (7 September 1909 – 6 July 1990) was a British diplomat and author specialising in Middle Eastern studies.

Biography
Richmond was born in England but spent much of his childhood in Palestine and Jordan.  He returned to England in 1922 and was educated at Lancing College, followed by Hertford College, Oxford.  Following the completion of his studies he returned to the Middle East and served with British military intelligence in Egypt, Lebanon, Syria and Iraq during the Second World War.  He entered the Diplomatic Service in 1947 and was British Ambassador to Kuwait between 1961–1963 and Sudan from 1965-1966.  He retired in 1966 and joined the department of Islamic Studies at the University of Durham.

Works
The Arabs of Palestine (1972)
Bahrain social and political change since the First World War (ed. with William Hale)(1976)
A commentary by Sir John Richmond on ‘The Palestinians and the PLO’, Bernard Lewis (1976)
Egypt, 1798-1952: her advance towards a modern identity (1977).

References

RICHMOND, Sir John (Christopher Blake), Who Was Who, A & C Black, 1920–2016 (online edition, Oxford University Press, 2014)

External links
Personal and research papers of Sir John Richmond relating to the history of the Arab-Israeli conflict

1909 births
1990 deaths
People educated at Lancing College
Alumni of Hertford College, Oxford
Knights Commander of the Order of St Michael and St George
Ambassadors of the United Kingdom to Sudan
Ambassadors of the United Kingdom to Kuwait
Academics of Durham University